Silent Lies is a 1996 American drama film directed by Peter Kiwitt and written and co-produced by Samuel Bernstein. Released on October 10, 1996, through Image Entertainment, the film stars Elizabeth Anne Allen as a bright high school senior whose life is turned upside down when her abusive father returns to her life.

Plot
Shelly Saltemeir is an overachieving senior student in her last year of high school in a small Texas town. She works part-time to provide for her family, which consists of her 14-year-old sister Tanya and her deadbeat stepmother, Ruby. She occasionally visits her mother's grave and hangs out with her best friend Raymond. Unknown to her family and friends, Shelly is plagued with nightmares of the incestuous sexual abuse she received from her father Carl, who groomed her into having sex with him since she was a child. Shelly was only freed from her abuse after Carl fled to Mexico to avoid the authorities over a busted drug deal. As a result of her ordeal, Shelly is protective over Tanya, who had begun exploring her sexuality.

One day, Shelly returns home to find Carl, who had come home as a surprise after his charges were dropped and cleared by charming his way through the authorities. While Ruby and Tanya are overjoyed at his return, Shelly feigns happiness while secretly dreading his presence, especially when it is clear he is still sexually attracted to her now she has grown up. Carl's actions at their home make Shelly uncomfortable, such as loudly having sex with Ruby and walking into her room naked, and he begins to notice his daughter's discomfort. Shelly's paranoia around her father causes her nightmares to aggravate and her to feel physically sick.

Shelly manages to become valedictorian and is gifted a car by her father; she takes it on a ride with Tanya and she proposes that they escape town together but backs out when she is unable to convince Tanya that she is unsafe around Carl. She fends off another sexual advance by her father; due to believing Carl would sway the police to his side if she reports him, she comes up with a plan to kill him instead. Having overheard him planning another drug deal, Shelly proposes to Raymond that he pose as Carl's drug dealer, lure him to a remote site, and kill him there before staging it as a drug deal gone wrong. Raymond agrees to the plan after Shelly confesses her abuse. Shelly realizes Carl has begun grooming Tanya, and, after stopping Carl from potentially harming her, is beaten by her father.

After Raymond manages to convince Carl's contact about being Carl's dealer, Shelly comes home to see Carl had taken Tanya out to town and gotten her drunk. Knowing what he could do to her sister, she diverts Carl's attention to her by suggestively touching him; he later goes to her room and she reluctantly allows her father to have sex with her. As Shelly begins retrieving items to stage her father's murder, Carl becomes suspicious and begins following her, and later violently confronts his daughter about what she is doing. Shelly manages to lie to Carl before she and Raymond set the final stages for their plan.

Shelly and Raymond arrive at the site of the deal, an abandoned cabin, where they prepare for Carl's arrival. Shelley fires at a figure which turns out to be Tanya, who Carl brought along with her, possibly to rape her. After patching up the seriously injured Tanya, Shelley, Raymond, and Carl fight around the cabin. Carl manages to gain the upper hand and holds Raymond and Shelley at gunpoint before he is finally gunned down by Tanya, who finally sees her father's abusive ways. Shelley tries to plant the evidence according to her plan but could not push through due to her trauma. Raymond tells her that they will instead tell the police the truth before they leave to get medical help for Tanya.

Cast 

 Elizabeth Anne Allen as Shelly Saltemeir
Michael Harris as Carl Saltemeir
Cedrick Terrell as Raymond
Dana Daurey as Tanya Saltemeir
Bonnie Burroughs as Ruby Saltermeir

External links

1996 films
1996 drama films
Films about dysfunctional families
Films about child sexual abuse
Films about sexual abuse
Incest in film
1990s English-language films